Dany Verissimo (born 27 June 1982), is a French actress and model. She originally worked from 2001 to 2002 as a pornographic actress under the stage name Ally Mac Tyana before starting a mainstream career. She also uses the name Dany Verissimo-Petit.

Early life 
The child of a Malagasy mother and a French father who separated before her birth, Verissimo spent her childhood in France, the United States, and Nigeria. In France, she lived in Vitry-sur-Seine. Verissimo attended a boarding school.

Career

Adult
She started appearing in pornographic films at the age of 18. She later explained that she had tried to become an actress but, failing to land roles, had considered working in softcore erotica. She then made the acquaintance of adult film director John B. Root who convinced her that due to her unusual looks she would find more success in pornography.

At the time, she used the stage name Ally Mac Tyana, which was a play on Ally McBeal and her second name, Malalatiana. She worked in the French porn industry from 2001 to 2002, with all of her adult pictures either directed or produced by Root.

Mainstream productions
In 2002 Verissimo had her first non-erotic film role, as an extra in So Long Mister Monroe and she made an appearance on an episode of the French police drama Brigade des mineurs. In 2004, she was cast as Lola in the film District 13 (Banlieue 13), produced by Luc Besson.

In 2006, she appeared in 'ELLE's "Cannes Special Edition". That same year, she was cast in the film Gradiva, directed by Alain Robbe-Grillet. The film was shown out of competition at the 63rd Venice International Film Festival.

Verissimo played a recurring role in the TV series Maison Close, broadcast on Canal+ from 2010 to 2013.

Her 2013 performance in the play D.A.F. Marquis de Sade, based on the life of the legendary writer and directed by Nicolas Briançon, won critical accolades.

She starred in the 2009 comedy drama film Shot List, written and directed by Joe LiTrenta, as Chicken, her first English-language role.

Personal life
Verissimo speaks French and English.

She gave birth to her first child in 2003.

Filmography

Film
2002 : So Long Mister Monore, by Éric Dahan (cameo)
2002 : The Red Siren, by Olivier Megaton (cameo)
 2004 : District 13 (Banlieue 13), by Pierre Morel
 2006 : Gradiva, by Alain Robbe-Grillet
 2008 : Les Princes de la nuit, by Patrick Levy
 2008 : Finding, by The Salto Brothers (short; also associate producer)
 2009  : Shot List, by Joe LiTrenta
 2011 : La Planque, by Akim Isker
 2012 : Emprise, by Vincent Arnaud (short)
 2013 : En pays cannibale, by Alexandre Villeret
 2016 : Par tous les seins, by Caroline Le Moing (short)
 2017 : Girls with Balls, by Olivier Afonso

Television
 2002 : Brigade des mineurs, one episode
 2006 : Section de recherches, season one, one episode
 2009 : La Taupe 2, by Vincenzo Marano
 2010 : Boulevard du Palais, season twelve, one episode
 2010-2013 : Maison Close, recurring role, two seasons
 2011 : Julie Lescaut, season twenty, one episode
 2016 : Section de recherches, season ten, one episode
 2016 : Le juge est une femme, season fourteen, one episode
 2017 : The Bureau (Le Bureau des légendes), season three, one episode

References

External links 
 
 
 
 

1982 births
Living people
People from Vitry-sur-Seine
French film actresses
French female models
French people of Malagasy descent
French pornographic film actresses